Laindon is a commuter town in Essex, between Basildon and West Horndon. It was an ancient parish in Essex, England, that was abolished for civil purposes in 1937. It was based on the (probably smaller) manor of the same name and now lies mostly within the urban area of Basildon.

As of 2020, Laindon's population was 37,175.

History
The ancient Laindon parish included the chapelry of Basildon that became a civil parish in its own right in 1866. The parish included two detached pieces of coastal grazing land, one of which was on Canvey Island. It included a long finger of land north into the neighbouring parish of Great Burstead to include Laindon Common and the once larger and adjacent Frith Wood which the lord of the manor, the Bishop of London, emparked around 1260. This finger of land may have been the territory of Well Street Manor, which was mentioned in the Domesday Book. Until its abolition in 1937, there was a Laindon parish. Laindon was part of the Billericay Rural District from 1894 to 1934 and had a parish council. In 1931 it had a population of 4,552. The parish became part of Billericay Urban District in 1934, which was renamed Basildon Urban District in 1955. The district known as Laindon West was never part of the parish of Laindon but part of the parish of Dunton which was itself abolished in 1934.

The Five Links Estate was built in the late 1960s and early 1970s on land between the High Road and central Basildon. The housing is built in a distinctive pattern around pedestrian courtyards. Basildon Council are currently regenerating this area with the aim of reducing crime, and renaming some streets.

Since 2020, Laindon Centre has undergone modernisation with 224 homes and 16 shops planned, including several flats
.

Geography
It is north of Laindon railway station on the London, Tilbury and Southend line. South of the railway station and line is Langdon Hills. Laindon and Langdon Hills are part of the Basildon post town. To the south-west of Laindon, the Dunton Plotlands was an area of small plots of land used as weekend cottages or smallholdings during the mid-20th century.

Notable people 
 Josh Dubovie (born 1990), singer
 John Georgiadis (1939–2021), violinist and conductor
 Edgar Longstaffe (1852–1933), landscape painter
 Joan Sims (1930–2001), comedy actress

References

External links 
 Laindon and District Community Archive

Populated places in Essex
Former civil parishes in Essex
Basildon (town)